Friularachne is an extinct genus of mygalomorph spider which lived during the Late Triassic period in Italy. The genus was described in 2013 by Fabio M. Dalla Vecchia and Paul A. Selden, and contains the sole species Friularachne rigoi, found in the Dolomia di Forni Formation. It is possibly a member of the Atypoidea.

References 

†
Mesozoic arachnids
Triassic arthropods
Fossils of Italy
Fossil taxa described in 2013